Treemont Manor is a historic home located at Colonie in Albany County, New York. It was built in 1929 and is an "L" shaped Georgian Revival style mansion.  It set within a formal English garden. The main house is two and one half stories with a gable roof, with a two-story servant's wing attached. Also on the property is a contributing guest house.

It was listed on the National Register of Historic Places in 1985.

References

Houses on the National Register of Historic Places in New York (state)
Georgian Revival architecture in New York (state)
Houses completed in 1929
Houses in Albany County, New York
National Register of Historic Places in Albany County, New York